The 1928 season of the Mitropa Cup football club tournament was won by Ferencváros in a final against Rapid Wien. This was the second edition of the tournament.

Quarter-finals

|}

Playoff between Rapid Wien and MTK resulted in 1-0 victory for Rapid Wien.

Semi-finals

|}

Playoff between Viktoria Žižkov and Rapid Wien resulted in 3-1 victory for Rapid Wien.

Finals

|}

1st leg

2nd leg

Top goalscorers

References

External links 
 Mitropa Cup results at Rec.Sport.Soccer Statistics Foundation

1928
1928–29 in European football
1928–29 in Austrian football
1928–29 in Yugoslav football
1928–29 in Czechoslovak football
1928–29 in Hungarian football